Jaakko Ojaniemi (born 28 August 1980, in Peräseinäjoki) is a Finnish former decathlete. After winning medals in junior level, he represented Finland several times in major athletics competitions.

Since his retirement, he has worked as fitness coach of formula 1 driver Valtteri Bottas.

Achievements

References

External links

1980 births
Living people
People from Seinäjoki
Finnish decathletes
Athletes (track and field) at the 2004 Summer Olympics
Olympic athletes of Finland
Sportspeople from South Ostrobothnia